Only Time Will Tell is a collaborative record by Ian Gomm and Jeb Loy Nichols, released in 2010 on the Relaxa Records International record label.

Track listing
"Take This Hurt Off Me" - 2:59
"Hold On To A Dream" - 4:14
"I'll Take Good Care Of You" - 4:10
"Snakes and Ladders" - 4:39
"Surprise Surprise" - 3:10
"Mister Moon" - 3:05
"Quiet Life" - 2:03
"Hooked On Love" - 4:36
"You Must Believe Me" - 4:41
"Lovers Walk" - 3:15
"Years From Now" - 2:39
"Go Through Sunday" - 5:43
"No-One Love You Like I Do" - 3:43
"I Can't Write Another Song" - 3:43

Reception

References

2010 albums
Jeb Loy Nichols albums